Karen D. Davis is a neuroscience professor at the University of Toronto, and is the head of Division of Brain, Imaging & Behaviour, Krembil Research Institute at the University Health Network. Davis was inducted into the Johns Hopkins Society of Scholars in 2009, the Canadian Academy of Health Sciences in 2018  and the Royal Society of Canada in 2020 and is currently the president of the Canadian Pain Society.

She has previously held a Canada Research Chair in Brain and Behaviour. and was a Mayday Pain and Society Fellow.

Research
Davis' main interest is the central mechanisms underlying acute and chronic pain and temperature perception, the influence of attention, and mechanisms of plasticity under normal conditions and in patients with neurologic or psychiatric disorders. A variety of experimental techniques are used, including functional brain imaging (fMRI, PET, MEG), psychophysical and cognitive assessment, and electrophysiological recordings in the thalamus and cortex. Davis' laboratory has developed innovative brain-imaging approaches, culminating in the first functional MRI images of brain networks underlying the human pain experience and the first images of the impact of deep brain stimulation for Parkinsonian tremor.

Davis has also worked on variety of chronic pain conditions, concussion, and phantom pain.  She has demonstrated that findings support the hypothesis that the thalamic representation of the amputated limb remains functional in amputees with phantom sensations. Through several studies, she has shown important interactions between pain and cognition, by studying how brain networks shift their function towards pain while multitasking on cognitive tasks (Seminowicz et al., 2007; Erpelding et al., 2013) or when processing multimodal sensory information (Downar et al., 2000) or during mind wandering (Kucyi et al., 2013). She has introduced two influential theories that builds on  the neuromatrix concept of Melzack.  In the "pain switch" concept (Davis et al., 2015), she emphasizes the basic feeling of "ouch" that must be represented by a core brain mechanism, regardless of pain intensity or quality.  The other concept is called the Dynamic Pain Connectome  which emphasizes that spatiotemporal representation of pain in the brain is dynamic and includes activity in the salience and default mode network as well as the ascending nociceptive and antinociceptive pathways.

Davis has published 200 journal articles and book chapters that have been cited over 20,000 times and she has an h-index of 76.

Neuroethics Activities
Davis is active in neuroethics research and knowledge translations  She has written to raise awareness of the neuroethical and legal issues related to using brain imaging to diagnose chronic pain.  She chaired an IASP task force that studied this issue culminating in a paper "Brain imaging tests for chronic pain: medical, legal and ethical issues and recommendations" published in Nature Reviews Neurology in 2017. She is also co-volume editor with Daniel Buchman of a book volume on Pain Neuroethics (Elsevier; Judy Illes, Book Series editor).

Educational programs and outreach
Davis has been recognized for her outstanding mentorship by the Institute of Medical Science, University of Toronto (Silverman Award) and by the Canadian Pain Society Outstanding Pain Mentorship Award.

Davis has also created educational programs and published the book New Techniques for Examining the Brain. Her TED-Ed video titled "How does your brain respond to pain?" has hit over 2 million views.

Hippocratic Oath for scientists
Davis and her colleagues have made a case for a scholar's oath similar to Hippocratic Oath as a standard requirement for scientists. The oath text as used in the Institute Medical Sciences, Toronto is as follows:
I promise never to allow financial gain, competitiveness or ambition cloud my judgment in the conduct of ethical research and scholarship. I will pursue knowledge and create knowledge for the greater good, but never to the detriment of colleagues, supervisors, research subjects or the international community of scholars of which I am now a member.

Selected publications

References

Canadian cognitive neuroscientists
Canadian women neuroscientists
University of Toronto alumni
Academic staff of the University of Toronto
Year of birth missing (living people)
Place of birth missing (living people)
Living people
Canada Research Chairs